Geoffrey Allan Crossley, CMG (11 November 1920 – 13 June 2009) was a British diplomat, ambassador to Colombia and to the Holy See.

Career
Crossley was educated at Penistone Grammar School and Gonville and Caius College, Cambridge. During the Second World War he served in the Ministry of Supply (1941) and the Foreign Office (1942) and subsequently in Algeria and France. In 1945 he joined the Foreign Service and served as Second Secretary in Paris 1945–48. From 1949 to 1952 he was one of the two UK delegates to the United Nations Special Committee on the Balkans (UNSCOB). He was then posted to Singapore as deputy Regional Information Officer with the Commissioner-General for South-East Asia. In 1957–59 he served in the Consulate-General, Frankfurt, for the transition of the Saarland from French occupation to Germany. He was a Political Officer (later in charge of the Political Department) in the Middle East Command, later the Near East Command, Cyprus, 1959–61; Head of Chancery at Bern 1961–65; on secondment to the Ministry of Overseas Development as Head of the West and North Africa Department 1965–67; Deputy High Commissioner, Lusaka, 1967–69; and Counsellor, Oslo, 1969–73. His final diplomatic appointments were as Ambassador to Colombia, 1973–77 and Envoy to the Holy See, 1978–80.

After retiring from the Diplomatic Service, Crossley was Director, External Relations and Continuing Education, European Institute of Business Administration (INSEAD), Fontainebleau, 1980–84.

Crossley was appointed CMG in 1984.

References
CROSSLEY, Geoffrey Allan, Who Was Who, A & C Black, 1920–2008; online edn, Oxford University Press, Dec 2010, accessed 22 March 2012

1920 births
2009 deaths
People educated at Penistone Grammar School
Alumni of Gonville and Caius College, Cambridge
Ambassadors of the United Kingdom to Colombia
Ambassadors of the United Kingdom to the Holy See
Companions of the Order of St Michael and St George
British expatriates in Algeria
British expatriates in France
British expatriates in Singapore
British expatriates in Germany
British expatriates in Zambia
British expatriates in Norway